Portuguese Women’s Volleyball Second Division

The Portuguese Women’s Volleyball Second Division is the second-level Women’s Volleyball League in Portugal, which is also called (Portuguese: "3a Divisão de Voleibol"). After the 2010/2011 season, The Portuguese Women's Volleyball League A2 was cancelled, and Portuguese Women's Volleyball Second Division become the second tier in Portuguese volleyball system. The competition is organized by the Federação Portuguesa de Voleibol.

Portuguese League Champions – 2nd Division

References

http://www.fpvoleibol.pt/campeoesnacionais.php

League, Portuguese Volleyball